Osman Saleh Sabbe was born in 1932 in a village of Hirgigo in the suburb of Massawa, he was fifth of eight siblings. After attending local Islamic school, he joined Hirgigo primary school which was founded by Pasha Saleh Ahmed Kekia in 1944. After finishing elementary and middle school he traveled to Addis Ababa to complete his secondary school and attend teacher training college. While in Addis Ababa, he was active in establishing a Muslim student association.

After graduating from teacher training college, he returned to Hirgigo and worked as a teacher and later a principal of the school. In 1956 he took the General Certificate of Education Exam of the University of London and pursued his education with distance learning and he obtained a bachelor's degree in history and political science. Osman understood the importance of education and the lack of proper education institutes in Eritrea and especially in the lowlands of Eritrea, therefore he used to encourage and send his students to Sudan and Egypt in pursuit of further education.

Osman Saleh Sabbe has six children (2 sons and 4 daughters) & his brother Mahmoud Saleh Sabbe was one of the ELF prisoners who was freed by ELF operation from Adi Quala prison in February 1975.

Exile
In the late 1940s and early 1950s during his time in Addis Ababa, Eritrean politics was in a crossroad, where Eritrean nationalist movement was springing. Like many Eritrean patriot Osman had a strong stand on the need for Eritrean independence and his activities were put under surveillance by the Ethiopian authorities and forced to exile to Aden, Yemen in 1960.

Revolutionary leaders such as Romadan Mohammed Nur, Alamin Mohammed Said and Ibrahim Affa that made great contribution towards the struggle of Eritrean Independence were some of his students from Hirghigo School.

Osman Saleh Sabbe died of a sudden illness in 1987 in a hospital in Cairo, Egypt.

Political life
Osman dedicated his life to the struggle of Eritrean independence and became the backbone of Eritrean revolution during the dark and desperate years. After exile, Osman focused his activity in bringing follow Eritreans in exile into strengthening the fight for independence agenda. During this time Osman had participated in the Eritrean Liberation Front (ELF) leadership and was appointed as head of foreign affair. He succeeded in raising awareness of the Eritrean struggle for independence across the Middle-Eastern and African countries such as Yemen, Somalia, Saudi Arabia, Egypt, and Syria.

Achievements
Some of Osman's achievements were
1. Creating awareness and sympathy to Eritreans and Eritrean cause across the world 
2. Proving full military logistic supply to Eritrean Liberation Army from friendly countries across the world
3. Enabling Somalian government to issue Somali diplomatic passport to Eritrean revolutionary leaders
4. Enabling Eritrean refugees in the Mideast and North Africa to get residence permit 
5. Enabling Eritrean refugees access to free school education in Mideast and North Africa 
6. Enabling Eritrean or convert refugees access to free higher education scholarship Mideast and North Africa
7. Authoring Eritrean History and related books and publications

Books
a. The roots of the Eritrean disagreements and how to solve them 
by Osman Saleh Sabbe.
Published 1978
b. The history of Eritrea 
by Othman Saleh Sabby; translated by Muhamad Fawaz al-Azem.
Published 1970 by Dar al-Masirah in Beirut, Lebanon 
c. Speech of the Foreign Mission Delivered by Osman Saleh Sabbe, the Official Spokesman
d. Objective Account on the Ethiopian Attitude Towards Eritrea: In the Light of Historical, Geographical and Political Realities

References

External links
 
 
 
 Articles on life & work of martyred Osman Saleh Sabbe
 The Intellectual Leader Osman Saleh Sabbe, Awate.com
 
 

1932 births
1987 deaths
Eritrean Muslims
Eritrean nationalists
Eritrean non-fiction writers
Eritrean expatriates in Egypt
People from Northern Red Sea Region
Eritrean male writers
20th-century non-fiction writers
Male non-fiction writers